is a Japanese conductor.

Biography
Oue began his conducting studies with Hideo Saito of the Toho Gakuen School of Music. In 1978, Seiji Ozawa invited him to spend the summer studying at the Tanglewood Music Center. There he met Leonard Bernstein, who became a mentor. Oue won the Tanglewood Koussevitzky Prize in 1980. He also studied under Bernstein as a conducting fellow at the Los Angeles Philharmonic Institute.

Oue became music director of the Greater Boston Youth Symphony Orchestras in 1982, a post he held until 1989. He was music director of the Erie Philharmonic from 1990 to 1995. He has also served as associate conductor of the Buffalo Philharmonic Orchestra. From 1995 to 2002, he was music director of the Minnesota Orchestra. During his Minnesota tenure, the orchestra saw its attendance decline from 84% to 69% in capacity. He presided over the orchestra's first tours to Europe and Japan. He also made recordings with Minnesota, most on the Reference Records label. Oue served as music director of the Grand Teton Music Festival in Wyoming from 1997 to 2003.

After a 1997 tour with the NDR Philharmonie Hannover, Oue was appointed its principal conductor in September 1998. In 2003, he was appointed principal conductor of the Osaka Philharmonic Orchestra. Oue made his debut at the Bayreuth Festival in 2005, conducting Tristan und Isolde. He became music director of the Orquestra Simfònica de Barcelona in September 2006, stepping down in 2010.

Oue's commercial recordings include Niccolò Paganini’s Violin Concerto No. 1 and Louis Spohr’s Violin Concerto No. 8 with the Swedish Radio Symphony Orchestra and Hilary Hahn for Deutsche Grammophon.

He has been professor of conducting at the Musikhochschule Hannover since 2000.

Awards
2006 Osaka Culture Prize Special Arts Prize

Discography
 Dominick Argento: Casa Guidi, Capriccio for Clarinet and Orchestra and In Praise of Music, with Frederica von Stade, Burt Hara and the Minnesota Orchestra, Reference Recordings, 2002

External links
 Eiji Oue biography
 IMG Artists agency biography

References

Japanese conductors (music)
Musicians from Hiroshima
Toho Gakuen School of Music alumni
1957 births
Living people
Academic staff of the Hochschule für Musik, Theater und Medien Hannover
21st-century conductors (music)
20th-century conductors (music)
20th-century Japanese male musicians
20th-century classical musicians
21st-century Japanese male musicians
21st-century classical musicians
Japanese male conductors (music)